is a Japanese comedian and television presenter. He is represented with Yoshimoto Creative Agency (Yoshimoto Kogyo). He graduated from Hyōgo Prefectural Takarazuka High School. He is nicknamed .

Filmography

Current appearances
 Regular programmes

 Special programmes (in which he appears at intervals of less than a year since his latest appearance)

Former appearances
 Regular programmes

 Special programmes

Dramas

Radio

Advertisements

Video games

Bibliography

Discography

See also
Yoshimoto Kogyo
Performer
Television presenter
Motoharu Sano – Relating to "Koji Higashino Ishigakijima Triathlon"
Koji Imada

References

Notes

External links
 

Japanese comedians
Japanese television presenters
People from Hyōgo Prefecture
1967 births
Living people